Ravi Kumar Sonkar (born 16 August 1980) is an Indian politician and a member of 17th Legislative Assembly of Uttar Pradesh of India. He represents the Mahadewa (Assembly constituency) in the Basti district of Uttar Pradesh and is a member of the Bharatiya Janata Party.

Early life and education
Sonkar was born 16 August 1980 in Purani Basti, Basti district of Uttar Pradesh to his father Kalpnath Sonkar (former MP of Basti). In 2006, he married Archana Sonkar, they have two daughters. He belongs to Scheduled Caste (Khatik Sonkar) community. In 2011, he attended Deen Dayal Upadhyay Gorakhpur University and attained Bachelor of Arts degree.

Political career
Sonkar inherited his passion for politics, his father Kalpanath Sonkar has been the MP from Basti (1989-1991). Since 2017, he has represented the Mahadewa (Assembly constituency) and is a member of the Bharatiya Janata Party. He defeated Bahujan Samaj Party candidate Doodhram Chaudhary by a margin of 25,884 votes.

Posts held

References

Uttar Pradesh MLAs 2017–2022
Bharatiya Janata Party politicians from Uttar Pradesh
Living people
People from Basti district
1980 births